The 1824 Missouri gubernatorial election was held on August 2, 1824, Frederick Bates defeated Lt. Gov William Henry Ashley.  Both candidates were members of the Democratic-Republican Party.  The death of Frederick Bates in August 1825, meant that the next election for governor of Missouri would be held little more than a year after this election.

Results

References

Missouri
1824
Gubernatorial
August 1824 events